Damon Hague (born 29 October 1970) is a former two weight World Boxing Foundation champion.

Hague was the first boxer ever to win a World Boxing Foundation World title from Derby. In late 2003, Hague was due to defend his WBF title against Robin Reid, but Reid decided to take on Sven Ottke in Germany.

Hague was also undefeated British kick boxing Champion and Midlands Area Boxing champion. Hague's last professional fight on 24 September 2004 was for the British and Commonwealth Super Middleweight titles against Carl Froch.

Fight record
28 Fights
Wins 23
Loses 4
Draws 1
World Boxing Foundation Super Middleweight Champion
World Boxing Foundation Middleweight Champion
World Boxing Foundation Pan-European Champion
British and Commonwealth title challenger
Midlands Area Champion

References

External links

Living people
1970 births
Boxers from Derby
English male boxers
English male kickboxers
Middleweight boxers